ISO 3166-2:BR is the entry for Brazil in ISO 3166-2, part of the ISO 3166 standard published by the International Organization for Standardization (ISO), which defines codes for the names of the principal subdivisions (e.g. provinces or states) of all countries coded in ISO 3166-1.

Currently for Brazil, ISO 3166-2 codes are defined for 26 states and 1 federal district. The Federal District has a special status similar to the states.

Each code consists of two parts, separated by a hyphen. The second part is two letters, widely used in Brazil as abbreviations of the states and federal district.

Current codes
Subdivision names are listed as in the ISO 3166-2 standard published by the ISO 3166 Maintenance Agency (ISO 3166/MA).

Click on the button in the header to sort each column.

Previous codes 
The following codes were used for previous states and territories:
 FN: Territory of Fernando de Noronha, split from Pernambuco (PE) in 1942, merged back into the state in 1988.
 GB: State of Guanabara, merged into Rio de Janeiro (RJ) in 1975. Was the country capital until 1960, replaced by Distrito Federal (DF).
 GR: Territory of Guaporé, formed from parts of Amazonas (AM) and Mato Grosso (MT) in 1943, renamed Rondônia (RO) in 1956, became a state in 1981.
 IC: Territory of Iguaçu, formed from parts of Paraná (PR) and Santa Catarina (SC) in 1943, merged back into the states in 1946.
 PP: Territory of Ponta Porã, split from Mato Grosso (MT) in 1943, merged back into the state in 1946, part of Mato Grosso do Sul (MS) from its formation in 1977.
 RB: Territory of Rio Branco, split from Amazonas (AM) in 1943, renamed Roraima (RR) in 1962, became a state in 1988.

Hierarchical numeric representation 
IBGE conventions for numerical representation of each current federation unit, where the first digit is the region and the second digit its element:

This is not part of the ISO standard but there is a direct mapping between ISO codes and IBGE numbers. IBGE is the authority for the ISO codes and defined both codes and numbers.

See also
 FIPS region codes of Brazil

External links
 ISO Online Browsing Platform: BR
 States of Brazil, Statoids.com

References

2:BR
ISO 3166-2